WAEL-FM (96.1 FM), branded on-air as FM96, is an FM Radio Station with offices and studios  in Mayaguez, Puerto Rico,  covers the western half of the island. Transmitter and tower at Monte del Estado Maricao, Puerto Rico.  On air since early 1970s.

Ownership
WAEL-FM is owned and operated by WAEL, Inc. a Puerto Rican Company founded in 1957 by the Pirallo-Lopez Family, Studios at De Diego 3 este  Mayaguez, Puerto Rico.

Telephone Office 787-832-4560 and 787-834-4696 on air.

Programming
Spanish hits like Merengue, Salsa, Baladas, Bachatas, Rock en Espanol.

 6am to 10am La Movida con Elvin Seguinot
10am to 3pm  Jose Mendez   
 11am to 1pm La Hora del Comelon con Rousty y Jose Mendez "El Bandido"
 3pm to 7pm Bumper to Bumper con Juan Carlos "The Boss"
 8pm to 1am Jose Vivas
 1am to 6am M-Th Abigail  Th-Fr Ernesto Velez
 Weekends  Fin de Semana  Melitza Nazario y Ernesto Velez

External links

AEL-FM
Radio stations established in 1972
Maricao, Puerto Rico
1972 establishments in Puerto Rico